Jhalak Dikhhla Jaa 10 is the tenth season of Jhalak Dikhhla Jaa, an Indian reality and dance television series produced by BBC Worldwide Productions Company. The season was hosted by Manish Paul  and judged by Karan Johar, Madhuri Dixit, Nora Fatehi, and Terence Lewis. The series premiered from 3 September 2022 to 27 November 2022 on Colors TV and digitally streamed on Voot. Gunjan Sinha emerged as the winner of the show.

Contestants status 
Note:- Since only Winner was announced among the Top 3 and Top 3 among the Top 5, average score of the contestants determine their ranks considering the international format stated in the show.

Contestants and choreographers 

The season consisted of twelve original couples and four wildcards:

 Ada Malik and Shyam Yadav
 Ali Asgar as Dadi and Lipsa Acharya
 Amruta Khanvilkar and Pratik Utekar
 Dheeraj Dhoopar and Sneha Singh
 Dutee Chand and Raveena Choudhary
 Faisal Shaikh and Vaishnavi Patil
 Gashmeer Mahajani and Romsha Singh
Gunjan Sinha and Tejas Verma (Sagar Bora as their dance mentor)
 Nia Sharma and Tarun Raj Nihalani
 Nishant Bhat and Anuradha Iyengar
 Niti Taylor and Akash Thapa
 Paras Kalnawat and Shweta Sharda
 Rubina Dilaik and Sanam Johar
 Shilpa Shinde and Nishchal Sharma
Sriti Jha and Vivek Chachere
 Zorawar Kalra and Suchitra Sawant

Score chart 

 No scores were given in Week 1.
 Shilpa didn't perform in Week 7 due to being eliminated after losing to Paras in the combined judges' scores and audience votings for the Week 6.
 Gashmeer didn't perform in Week 8 because he was down with Dengue fever.
 No Elimination happened in Week 8 due to Diwali.
 In Week 9 Team "Madhuri Ke Rockstars" was initially "Team Nora" with Nora as captain. But was renamed and replaced with Madhuri as Nora was replaced with Terence Lewis as a judge for the week as Fatehi missed it due to a family emergency.
 In Week 9 the maximum score was converted to 20-points basis with the captain not giving any score to participants performing from their team.
 In Week 9 all the couples from the winning team were eligible for "Golden Chair" while all the couples from the losing team were prone to elimination. The winning team was decided by average scores of that team.
In Week 10 contestants were asked to perform with the dancing partners of other contestants instead of their original ones.
This was the season's first "double elimination" in Week 10; both Amruta and Paras were eliminated.
The winner of Golden Chair in Week 11 directly entered the finale in Week 11. As a result Gashmeer became the first contestant to qualify for the finale.
No "Golden Chair" awarded in weeks 12 and 13 due to semi-finale and grand-finale respectively 

red numbers indicates the lowest score.
green numbers indicates the highest score.
 Team Madhuri Ke Rockstars
 Team Karan Ke Johars
 indicates the swapped partners in Week 10.
 indicates the winning couple.
 indicates the runner-up couple.
 indicates the second runner-up couple.
 indicates the fourth-place couple.
 the couple earned immunity, and could not be eliminated.
 indicates the returning couple that finished in the bottom two.
 indicates the couple eliminated that week.
 indicates the couple has walked out of the show.

Averages 
This table only counts for dances scored on a traditional 30-point scale.

Note
Since no scores were given in Week 1, the table below consists of scores from Week 2 onwards.
Week 9 scores have been converted to a 30-point base.

Twists

Jhalak Passport
One of the twists that featured in this season was "Jhalak Passport". The Jhalak Passport of contestants whose performances impressed the judges will receive the Golden Stamp and the recipients will become contenders for the Golden Chair.

Golden Stamp winners

There was no "Golden Stamp" given in Week 9 due to participants performing for their respective teams and it was announced that all participating celebrity couples from the winning team will be eligible for "Golden Chair" and the losing team couples will face elimination in the following week.
No "Golden Stamp" and "Golden Chair" were given in weeks 12 and 13 due to them being semi-finale and grand-finale weeks respectively.

Golden Chair
This season of Jhalak Dikhhla Jaa introduced a first-of-its-kind Golden Chair system in which the contestant winning the Golden Chair will be immune from elimination for the following week.

Gashmeer Mahajani and Romsha Singh became the first participating couple to win the Golden Chair twice and became immune from elimination for the Week 3 and then again in Week 4.

Nia Sharma, Amruta Khanvilkar, Gunjan Sinha, Niti Taylor and Faisal Shaikh have won the Golden Chair since then.

Voting and elimination
The show follows its traditional elimination policy of grand total of judges' scores and audience votings for the bottom two contestants. The contestant in the bottom two with least number of combined judges' scores and audience votings is eliminated in the following week at the end of Sunday's episode. 

Ali Asgar and his choreographer Lipsa Acharya became the first participating couple to be eliminated in Week 3 followed by Dheeraj Dhoopar and Dutee Chand quitting the series in two consecutive weeks.

Zorawar Kalra and his choreographer Suchitra Sawant became the second participating couple to be eliminated in Week 6.

Shilpa Shinde and her choreographer Nishchal Sharma became the third participating couple to be eliminated in Week 7.

Ada Malik and her choreographer Shyam Yadav became the fourth participating couple to be eliminated in Week 9.

Amruta Khanvilkar and her choreographer Pratik Utekar and Paras Kalnawat and his choreographer Shweta Sharda became the fifth and sixth couples to be eliminated in Week 10 and the first two couples who faced the season's first "double elimination".

Nia Sharma and her choreographer Tarun Raj Nihalani and Niti Taylor and her choreographer Akash Thapa became the seventh and eighth couples to be eliminated in Week 12 and the second two couples who faced the season's second "double elimination".

However, on Week 13 Nishant, Sriti and Gashmeer tied in the audience vote, so elimination was based only on the judges' score.

Themes 
The celebrities and professional partners danced one of these routines for each corresponding week:
Week 1: Introduction and Jhalak Passport
Week 2: Retro Special (Life in a Retro)
Week 3: Family Special (Mera Parivaar, Best Parivaar)
Week 4: Bollywood Special and Mahasangam with Khatron Ke Khiladi 12
Week 5: Jhalak of India
Week 6: Kapoor Special
Week 7: Desh Ki Demand
Week 8: Diwali Special
Week 9: Dance War (Madhuri Ke Rockstars vs Karan Ke Johars)
Week 10: Adla-Badli (Partner-swapping)
Week 11: 90s Special
Week 12: Blockbuster Semi-Finale
Week 13: Grand Finale

Week 3 was themed 'Family' Special, and each of the participating celebrities dedicated their performances (Dutee gave her introductory performance this week) as follows:

 Ali & Lipsa: His fictional character Dadi
 Amruta & Pratik: Her mother
 Dheeraj & Sneha: His wife
 Faisal & Vaishnavi: His friends
 Gashmeer & Romsha: His mother
 Gunjan & Tejas: Her father

 Niti & Akash: Karan Johar as a father
 Nia & Tarun: Her brother
 Paras & Shweta: His deceased father
 Rubina & Sanam: Her husband
 Shilpa & Nishchal: Her disloyal family
 Zorawar & Suchitra: His co-workers and friends

Week 4 was themed "Bollywood Special" and Mahasangam (merger) with Khatron Ke Khiladi 12 finale, and each participating celebrity gave tribute to iconic actors of Bollywood by performing their iconic songs in Khatron Ke Khiladi style as follows:

Amruta and Ashish: Madhuri Dixit doing Kathak and Bharatnatyam her iconic song Dola Re Dola
Dutee and Raveena: Aamir Khan and Rani Mukerjee performing their iconic song Aati Kya Khandala
Faisal and Vaishnavi: Ajay Devgan performing his iconic song Singham on a see-saw-like platform
Gashmeer and Romsha: Shah Rukh Khan performing a mash-up of his iconic songs Chhaiyya Chhaiyya, Dard-e-Disco and Tumse Milke Dil Ka Hai Jo Haal on Rostrum
Gunjan and Tejas: Preity Zinta and Hrithik Roshan performing a mash-up of their iconic songs Bumbro Bumbro and Rind Posh Maal

Niti and Akash: Nargis Dutt and Raj Kapoor performing their iconic song Pyaar Hua Ikraar Hua
Nia and Tarun: Raveena Tandon performing her iconic song Tip Tip Barsa Pani on a rotating platform with a pole
Paras and Shweta: Hrithik Roshan and Preity Zinta performing their iconic song It's Magic
Rubina and Sanam: Priyanka Chopra performing her iconic song Ram Chahe Leela with a blindfold and Aerial Silk
Shilpa and Nishchal: Sridevi performing her iconic song Naino Mein Sapna
Zorawar and Suchitra: Mithun Chakraborty performing a mash-up of his iconic songs I'm a Disco Dancer and Yaad Aa Raha Hai Tera Pyaar on a spinning platform

Week 5 was themed "Jhalak of India" and each participating celebrity represented a state in India with that state's signature traditional dresses:

Amruta and Pratik: Representing Maharashtra
Dutee and Raveena: Representing Karnataka
Faisal and Vaishnavi: Representing Kerala
Gashmeer and Romsha: Representing Tamil Nadu
Gunjan and Tejas: Representing Assam

Nia and Tarun: Representing Uttar Pradesh
Niti and Akash: Representing Gujarat
Paras and Shweta: Representing Rajasthan
Rubina and Sanam: Representing Himachal Pradesh
Shilpa and Nishchal: Representing Bihar
Zorawar and Suchitra: Representing Punjab

Week 6 was themed "Kapoor Special" as a tribute to the Kapoors of Bollywood where Neetu Kapoor arrived as the guest for the same. Each of the participating celebrities gave their tribute to one member of Kapoor family by performing their iconic songs as follows:

Amruta and Pratik: Tribute to Raj Kapoor by performing his iconic song Jeena Yahan Marna Yahan
Faisal and Vaishnavi: Tribute to Shammi Kapoor by performing his iconic song Oh Haseena Zulfon Wali
Gashmeer and Romsha: Tribute to Shashi Kapoor by performing his iconic song O Meri Sharmilee
Gunjan and Tejas: Tribute to Kareena Kapoor by performing her iconic song You're My Soniya
Nia and Tarun: Tribute to Prithviraj Kapoor by performing his iconic song Jab Pyaar Kiya Toh Darna Kya
Niti and Akash: Tribute to Ranbir Kapoor and  Alia Bhatt Kapoor by performing their iconic songs Khuda Jaane and Baba Mein Teri Malika.

Paras and Shweta: Tribute to Ranbir Kapoor by performing his iconic song Badtameez Dil
Rubina and Sanam: Tribute to Karisma Kapoor by performing her iconic song Le Gayi
Shilpa and Nishchal: Tribute to Kareena Kapoor by performing her iconic song San Sana San
Zorawar and Suchitra: Tribute to Rishi Kapoor

Week 7 was themed "Desh Ki Demand" where each participating celebrity performed the demand made to them:

Ada and Shyam: Performed Drama Queen song fulfilling demand of "Showing her dramatic side"
Amruta and Pratik: Performed Choli Ke Peechhe Kya Hai song fulfilling demand of "Madhuri Dixit's Song"
Faisal and Vaishnavi:
Gashmeer and Romsha: Performed Zingaat song fulfilling the demand of "Marathi Tadka"
Gunjan and Tejas:
Nia and Tarun: Performed Jagg Jeeteya song fulfilling demand of "Tribute to 2016 Surgical Strike"

Nishant and Anuradha:
Niti and Akash:
Paras and Shweta: Performed Ae Dil Hai Mushkil song fulfilling demand of "One-sided obsessive love"
Rubina and Sanam: Performed Mayya Mayya & Mashallah songs fulfilling demand of "Belly Dance"
Shilpa and Nishchal: NOT IN COMPETITION
Sriti and Vivek: Performed Laal Ishq song fulfilling the demand of "Sringar ka Kumkum"

Week 8 was themed "Diwali Special" and each participating celebrity enacted either a particular god or a mythological character:

Ada and Shyam:
Amruta and Pratik: Enacted Lord Ram and Goddess Sita through the latter's Agnipariksha episode.
Faisal and Vaishnavi:
Gashmeer and Romsha: NOT IN COMPETITION
Gunjan and Tejas: Enacted Lord Krishn and his separation from his flute Venu

Nia and Tarun: Enacted Goddess Kali slaying the demon Raktbija
Nishant and Anuradha: Enacted Ravan's slaying
Niti and Akash: Enacted Goddess Ganga's descendant to Earth and Lord Shiva holding her on his head
Paras and Shweta: Enacted Lord Krishn and Goddess Radha's childhood, love story and separation.
Rubina and Sanam: Enacted Draupadi and her Cheerharan by Dushasana and its revenge by Bhima.
Sriti and Vivek: Danced as devotees of Lord Ganesh; evoking Lord Ganesh.

Week 9 was themed 'Dance War' where the two judges (Nora and Karan) chose their teams within the participants and the one with more scores (average) wins. The winning team is safe from next week's eviction.

Week 10 was themed 'Adla-Badli' where all the participating celebrities were asked to perform with the dancing partner of another celebrity instead of their original ones which were as follows:

 Amruta's choreographer Pratik was replaced by Ashish Patil for this week as the former was suffering from Dengue fever.
Sriti, Ada and Nishant gave their introductory performances this week.
Shilpa didn't perform this week due to health issues and was later eliminated.
Gashmeer didn't perform this week because he was down with Dengue fever.
In Week 9 Team "Madhuri Ke Rockstars" was initially termed as "Team Nora" with Nora as captain. But was renamed and replaced with Madhuri as Nora was replaced with Terence Lewis as a judge for the week.

Dance forms 
 Highest scoring dance
 Lowest scoring dance
 This couple danced, but received no scores
 The swapped choreographer for Week 10

Production

Broadcast
Apart from the usual weekend episodes, Voot has launched web exclusives like "Glowing Performers of the Week", "Judges Ki Jhalkiyaan", "The Bold Look of Kohler", and "Top Jodi Of The Week" tracing the contestants journey.

Casting 
In July 2022, after Shubhangi Atre quit the show on health basis, Shilpa Shinde replaced her marking the third collaboration after Chidiya Ghar (2013) and Bhabiji Ghar Par Hain! (2016). Rubina Dilaik was roped in for the tenth installment of Jhalak Dikhhla Jaa at the last moment.

Dutee Chand was cast as season's first wildcard and it was announced that she and Raveena would team up, making the show's first same-sex couple to feature for its tenth season. Chand walked out of the show in Week 5 due to her prior commitments for her tournaments.

Television actor Dheeraj Dhoopar walked out of the show in Week 4. He was missing from the shoots and later confirmed quitting the show owing to his health issues with consent of the makers.

Actress Sriti Jha was cast as the second wildcard of the season. A promo confirming Jha's entry was released on 2 October 2022.

Later choreographer Nishant Bhat and Ada Malik were confirmed to be joining the show as wildcards.

Controversies 
The series was marked by a series of controversies including:
Television actor Paras Kalnawat was replaced overnight from his show Anupamaa for participating in Jhalak Dikhhla Jaa, leading to a tiff between the actor and the production house of his previous show with him revealing many dark secrets of the production house.

Television actress Urfi Javed argued with her ex-boyfriend and actor Paras Kalnawat during the launch event as the latter was denied a role in Anupamaa, following which the team crew intervened to separate them. However they both denied the same and later supported each other with Javed praising Kalnawat for his performance while the latter stated, "We both have mutual respect for each other" and later clarified that, "We didn't fight at the party. In fact, she walked up to me and spoke to me nicely. People assumed that we were screaming at each other because the music was too loud and we had to literally shout to be heard."

Actress Shilpa Shinde accused the judges of "being not respectful towards contestants' hard work" and supported Rubina Dilaik and Nia Sharma after she was eliminated in Week 7, claiming "we do lot of hard work behind a three-minute performance and then don't get that respect from judges" and spoke of falling sick due to this. She also remarked that Johar should not judge the dance of the contestants as he himself is not a dancer and that Fatehi should go and learn some Hindi first.

On 6 November 2022, the season aired its first "double elimination" resulting in the evictions of Amruta Khanvilkar and Paras Kalnawat, resulting in backlash with fans alleging that the makers favoured the "Channel's faces" and eliminated strong contestants for the same.
"BOYCOTT JHALAK FINALE" started trending on Twitter after the news of Gunjan Sinha winning the season broke out.

Development 
Colors TV announced the comeback of series after a hiatus of five years in July 2022, with Manish Paul returning as host alongside Karan Johar, Madhuri Dixit and Nora Fatehi on the judges panel. The press conference and launch event for this season was held on 26 August 2022.

Speaking on the same, Chief Content Officer, Manisha Sharma, of Viacom18 said, "while five years is a big gap, the show has always had its audience, this is one of the most successful entertainment formats on Indian television and we are relishing our long-lasting relationship with BBC Worldwide Productions and look forward to many more such successful associations with them".

Filming 
The principal photography of the series commenced in August 2022 in Mumbai. Dixit, Fatehi and Johar, had been spotted shooting on Friday 5 August 2022. The shooting for the premiere week episodes started on 24 August 2022 at Film City, Mumbai. The contestants and judges were snapped shooting for the Retro Special week episodes which started on 5 September 2022. The judges and contestants were spotted shooting for the Family Special week episodes which started on 13 September 2022. The contestants and judges were snapped shooting for the Bollywood Special week episodes which started on 20 September 2022. The judges and contestants were spotted shooting for the Jhalak of India Special week episodes which started on 27 September 2022. The contestants and judges were snapped shooting for the Kapoor Special week episodes which started on 4 October 2022. The contestants and judges were spotted shooting for the Desh Ki Demand. Special week episodes which started on 11 October 2022.

The Grand Finale shooting was held on 22 November 2022 in Film City, Mumbai.

Release 
On 25 July 2022, a promo revealing the season's logo was released on Colors TV official Instagram and Twitter handles. Subsequently, the intro promos of Dheeraj, Nia, Paras, Shilpa, Amruta, Gashmeer, Ali, Niti Zorawar, and Rubina were released respectively.

Episodes

Guest appearances

Reception

Critical response
Mid-Day called it an "entertaining ride", and particularly noted the VFX and the "glittering set [which] is high on opulence", but faulted it for its "heavy-handed dose of drama".

Rediff.com, reviewing the first two episodes, deemed them "not just high on entertainment, but also on dance".

The Times of India lauded the comeback, calling it "worth the wait", with participants who "prove their mettle" and "give a tough competition".

Pinkvilla, reviewing the Grand Finale episode, called it a "dance extravaganza and all glitz and glam", with an "entertainment quotient just kept increasing".

See also 
List of programmes broadcast by Colors TV

References

External links 

 Jhalak Dikhhla Jaa 10 at Colors TV
 Jhalak Dikhhla Jaa 10 on Voot

2022 Indian television seasons
Jhalak Dikhhla Jaa seasons
Colors TV original programming